The red eel (Myroconger compressus) is an eel in the family Myrocongridae (thin eels). It was described by Albert Günther in 1870. It is a tropical, marine eel known from the eastern Atlantic Ocean, including St. Helena, Dakar, Senegal, and possibly São Tomé and Principe. Males are known to reach a maximum total length of 53.8 cm. These eel are classified as teleost fish, meaning they belong to a group of fish that comprises ray-finned fish. These fins aid the eel in gliding through the water faster or crawling on the ocean floor.

References

Eels
Fish described in 1870
Taxa named by Albert Günther